WFDD (88.5 MHz) is an FM public radio station licensed to Winston-Salem, North Carolina.  It is the National Public Radio (NPR) affiliate for the Greensboro/Winston-Salem/High Point media market, also called the Piedmont Triad.  Owned by Wake Forest University, WFDD serves 32 counties in Central North Carolina and South-Central Virginia.  It also operates a translator, W261CK on 100.1 FM in Boone.

The station airs news and talk shows from NPR during the day, with local news updates.  From 8 p.m. to 4 a.m., the station turns to classical music programming. It produced the syndicated show Across the Blue Ridge.

History

WFDD has its roots in a station operated by students at what was then Wake Forest College from a rooming house in the town of Wake Forest beginning in the fall of 1946. The station was so popular students began asking for an official station.  With the help of student fundraising, WAKE was fully licensed by 1948.

After discovering that the WAKE letters were already in use, the station changed its letters to WFDD, which stood for "Wake Forest Demon Deacons." Since the schools' sports teams were an important part of the station's programming, this seemed appropriate. Other programs included "Deaconlight Serenade," a student music program which included the part of the name of a Glenn Miller hit. This program remained on the air as "Deaconlight" until 1981. The WAKE letters returned in the 1980s on a student-run AM station, which later became available on the Internet.

After Wake Forest College moved to Winston-Salem, WFDD returned to the air with a 10-watt signal in 1961. The signal increased to 36,000 watts in 1967, the year the Corporation for Public Broadcasting began. WFDD became one of only 10 stations to have received federal funding from the new organization.

In 1958, Dr. Julian Burroughs, who had helped sign the station on and served as student station manager in the 1950-51 school year, became the station's first professional station manager, a post he held until 1981. His arrival began a transition to a more professional operation, culminating in 1961 when the station became a non-commercial educational radio station. On May 3, 1971, WFDD became a charter member of National Public Radio (NPR), the first affiliate of the network in the state. Burroughs added his knowledge to that of other station officials around the country to determine what NPR would become.

On May 5, 1989, WFDD lost its tower along Business 40 in Winston-Salem when severe storms struck the area. The station returned to the air with reduced power, but did not fully cover the market until a new tower was completed north of Lexington, which would be shared with WWGL.

For two years in the 1990s, WFDD aired Wake Forest football and basketball games, but many listeners complained.

For many years, WFDD's format was a mix of NPR programming and classical music.  In 2005, WFDD began airing more talk programming from NPR, with no classical music during the day on most weekdays. With less classical music, many classical music listeners protested the change by ceasing their donations; at the same time, the station saw an influx of new donors who appreciated the news and discussion programming. The station added a 24-hour classical music station on its HD radio subcarrier.

In 2009, WFDD began Radio Camp, a week-long experience for middle schoolers, where  students learn the basics of conducting interviews, how to operate professional sound editing software, and create their own stories to be broadcast. The camp is held at the WFDD studio on Wake Forest University's campus.

WFDD competes in much of its coverage area with WUNC-FM in Chapel Hill, the main NPR member for the Triangle. WUNC has long claimed the eastern Triad, including Greensboro, as part of its primary coverage area; its transmitter in Chatham County is roughly halfway between Greensboro and the core of the Triangle.

References

External links
WFDD official website

FDD
Wake Forest University
NPR member stations
Radio stations established in 1948